This article lists various individual and team records in relation to the Palestine national football team (The Fedayeen). The page currently shows the records as of 15 January 2020.

Individual records

Player records

Most-capped players

Top goalscorers

Manager records

Team records

Wins
 Largest win 
 11–0 vs  on 1 April 2006
 Largest home win 
 10–0 vs  on 10 October 2017
 Largest win at the Asian Cup 
 N/A

Draws 
 Highest scoring draw 
 3–3 vs  on 5 October 2016
 Highest scoring draw at the Asian Cup 
 0–0 vs  on 6 January 2019
 0–0 vs  on 15 January 2019

Defeats
 Largest defeat 
 8–1 vs  on 26 July 1953
 7–0 vs  on 5 October 2011
 Largest defeat at home  
 0–3 vs  on 4 August 2018
 Largest defeat at the Asian Cup 
 4–0 vs  on 12 January 2015
 5–1 vs  on 16 January 2015

Streaks
 Unbeaten record  12 games, 2016–2018
 Winless record  22 games, 2006–2011

World rankings

FIFA
Source: FIFA.com
 Highest FIFA ranking  73rd (February 2018)
 Lowest FIFA ranking  191st (April – August 1999)

Elo
Source: Eloratings.net
 Highest Elo ranking  90th (September 2019)
 Lowest Elo ranking  169th (September 2010)

Goal records

General
 First goal  Herbert Meitner vs  on 27 April 1940

 Most goals  Fahed Attal (2005–2012), 16 goals

. Highlighted names denote a player still playing or available for selection.

Hat-tricks

In major tournaments

AFC Asian Cup
 Most goals in a single Asian Cup tournament  Jaka Ihbeisheh (in 2015), 1 goal
 Most goals in total at Asian Cup tournaments  Jaka Ihbeisheh (in 2015), 1 goal
 Most goals in a single Asian Cup finals match  Jaka Ihbeisheh, 1 goal vs  on 16 January 2015
 First goal in an Asian Cup finals match Jaka Ihbeisheh, vs  on 16 January 2015

Competition records

FIFA World Cup

AFC Asian Cup

AFC Challenge Cup

WAFF Championship

Arab Cup

Pan Arab Games

Asian Games

Other tournaments

Head-to-head record 

Key

The following table shows Palestine's all-time official international record per opponent:
 after match against 

Last updated: Palestine vs Bangladesh, 5 September 2021. Statistics include official FIFA-recognised matches only.

Notes

References

 
National association football team records and statistics